High-speed railway track construction is the process by which  (LGV, litt. "high-speed railway line"), the land on which TGV trains are to run, is prepared for their use, involving carving the track bed and laying the track. This construction technique is used both for the French TGV network and other TGV-based networks outside of France.

It is similar to the building of standard railway lines, but there are differences. In particular, construction process is more precise in order for the track to be suitable for regular use at 300 km/h (186 mph). The quality of construction was put to the test in particular during the TGV world speed record runs on the LGV Atlantique; the track was used at over 500 km/h (310 mph) without suffering significant damage. This contrasts with previous French world rail speed record (326/331 km/h in 1955) attempts which resulted in severe deformation of the track.

Service

The first high-speed railway line outside of Japan, LGV Sud-Est, opened to the public between Paris and Lyon on 27 September 1981. Contrary to its earlier fast services, SNCF intended TGV service for all types of passengers, with the same initial ticket price as trains on the parallel conventional line. To counteract the popular misconception that the TGV would be a premium service for business travellers, SNCF started a major publicity campaign focusing on the speed, frequency, reservation policy, normal price, and broad accessibility of the service. This commitment to a democratised TGV service was enhanced in the Mitterrand era with the promotional slogan "Progress means nothing unless it is shared by all". The TGV was considerably faster (in terms of door to door travel time) than normal trains, cars, or aeroplanes. The trains became widely popular, the public welcoming fast and practical travel.

Preparing the trackbed
The work on a high-speed line (ligne à grande vitesse, or LGV) begins with earthmoving. The trackbed is carved into the landscape, using scrapers, graders, bulldozers and other heavy machinery. All fixed structures are built; these include bridges, flyovers, culverts, game tunnels, and the like. Drainage facilities, most notably the large ditches on each side of the trackbed, are constructed. Supply bases are established near the end of the high-speed tracks, where crews will form work trains to carry rail, sleepers and other supplies to the work site.

Next, a layer of compact gravel is spread on the trackbed. This, after being compacted by rollers, provides an adequate surface for vehicles with tyres. TGV tracklaying then proceeds. The tracklaying process is not particularly specialized to high-speed lines; the same general technique is applicable to any track that uses continuous welded rail. The steps outlined below are used around the world in modern tracklaying. TGV track, however, conforms to stringent requirements on materials, dimensions and tolerances.

Laying the track
To begin laying track, a gantry crane that rides on rubber tires is used to lay down panels of prefabricated track. These are laid roughly in the location where one of the tracks will be built (all LGVs have two tracks). Each panel is 18 metres (60 feet) long, and rests on wooden sleepers. No ballast is used at this stage, since the panel track is temporary.

Once the panel track is laid, a work train (pulled by diesel locomotives) can bring in the sections of continuous welded rail that will be used for the permanent way of this first track. The rail comes from the factory in lengths varying from 200 m (660 ft) to 400 m (1310 ft). Such long pieces of rail are just laid across several flatcars; they are very flexible, so this does not pose a problem. A special crane unloads the rail sections and places them on each side of the temporary track, approximately 3.5 m (12 ft) apart. This operation is usually carried out at night, for thermal reasons. The rail itself is standard UIC section, 60 kg/m (40 lb/ft), with a tensile strength of 800 newtons per square millimetre or megapascals (116,000 psi).

For the next step, a gantry crane is used again. This time, however, the crane rides on the two rails that were just laid alongside the temporary track. A train of flatcars, half loaded with LGV sleepers, arrives at the site. It is pushed by a special diesel locomotive, which is low enough to fit underneath the gantry cranes. The cranes remove the panels of temporary track, and stack them onto the empty half of the sleeper train. Next, they pick up sets of 30 LGV sleepers, pre-arranged with the proper spacing (60 cm, or 24 in), using a special fixture. The sleepers are laid on the gravel bed where the panel track was. The sleeper train leaves the worksite loaded with sections of panel track.

The sleepers, sometimes known as bi-bloc sleepers, are U41 twin block reinforced concrete, 2.4 m (7 ft 10 in.) wide, and weigh 245 kg (540 lb) each. They are equipped with hardware for Nabla RNTC spring fasteners, and a 9 mm (3/8 in.) rubber pad. (Rubber pads are always used under the rail on concrete sleepers, to avoid cracking). Next, a rail threader is used to lift the rails onto their final position on the sleepers. This machine rides on the rails just like the gantry cranes, but can also support itself directly on a sleeper. By doing this, it can lift the rails, and shift them inwards over the ends of the sleepers, to the proper gauge (standard gauge). It then lowers them onto the rubber sleeper cushions, and workers use a pneumatically operated machine to bolt down the Nabla clips with a predetermined torque. The rails are canted inward at a slope of 1 in 20.

Joining track sections
The sections of rail are welded together using thermite. Conventional welding (using some type of flame) does not work well on large metal pieces such as rails, since the heat is conducted away too quickly. Thermite is better suited to this job. It is a mix of aluminium powder and rust (iron oxide) powder, which reacts to produce iron, aluminum oxide, and a great deal of heat, making it ideal to weld rail.

Before the rail is joined, its length must be adjusted very accurately. This ensures that the thermal stresses in the rail after it is joined into one continuous piece do not exceed certain limits, resulting in lateral kinks (in hot weather) or fractures (in cold weather). The joining operation is performed by thermite welding process which is equipped with a rail saw, a weld shear and a grinder. When the thermite welding process is complete, the weld is ground to the profile of the rail, resulting in a seamless join between rail sections. Stress in the rail due to temperature variations is absorbed without longitudinal strain, except near bridges where an expansion joint is sometimes used.

Adding ballast
The next step consists of stuffing a deep bed of ballast underneath the new track. The ballast arrives in a train of hopper cars pulled by diesel locomotives. Handling this train is challenging, since the ballast must be spread evenly. If the train stops, ballast can pile over the rails and derail it.

A first layer of ballast is dumped directly onto the track, and a tamping-lining-levelling machine, riding on the rails, forces the stones underneath the sleepers. Each pass of this machine can raise the level of the track by 8 cm (3 in), so several passes of ballasting and of the machine are needed to build up a layer of ballast at least 32 cm (1 ft) thick under the sleepers. The ballast is also piled on each side of the track for lateral stability. The machine performs the initial alignment of the track. Next, a ballast regulator distributes the ballast evenly. Finally, a dynamic vibrator machine shakes the track to perform the final tamping, effectively simulating the passing of 2,500 axles.

Finishing construction
Now that the first track is almost complete, work begins on the adjacent track. This time, however, it is not necessary to lay a temporary track. Trains running on the first track bring the sleepers, and then the rail, which is unloaded directly onto the sleepers by dispensing arms that swing out to the proper alignment. The Nabla fasteners are secured, and the ballast is stuffed under the track as before.

The two tracks are now essentially complete, but the work on the line is not finished. The catenary masts need to be erected, and the wire strung on them. Once the catenary is complete, the track is given final alignment adjustments down to millimeter tolerances. The ballast is then blown to remove smaller gravel fragments and dust, which might be kicked up by trains. This step is especially important on high-speed tracks, since the blast of a passing train is strong. Finally, TGV trains are tested on the line at gradually increasing speeds. The track is qualified at speeds slightly higher than will be used in everyday operations (typically 350 km/h, or 210 mph), before being opened to commercial service.

References

Rail infrastructure in France
Maintenance of way equipment
High-speed rail in France
Rail technologies
Permanent way